Donders is a Dutch surname meaning "thunder's", perhaps originally referring to a person's temper or voice, or to an artillery man. Donders may refer to:

 Peter Donders (1807–1887), Dutch beatified Roman Catholic Missionary
 Franciscus Donders (1818–1889), Dutch ophthalmologist
Donders' law, describing the three-dimensional orientation of the eye and its axes of rotation
Donders Centre for Cognition and F.C. Donders Centre for Cognitive Neuroimaging, research institutes
 Rianne Donders-de Leest (born 1960), Dutch CDA politician
 Mireille Donders (born 1974), Swiss sprinter

See also
Donner, German surname with the same meaning

References

Dutch-language surnames